When Giants Walked the Earth: A Biography of Led Zeppelin is a book written by Mick Wall, published in 2008. It is a biography of the English rock band Led Zeppelin.

The book tells the life stories of the band's members. The narrative of Led Zeppelin is told  through a mixture of prose and interview excerpts. It was based partly on interviews which were conducted by Wall with all the surviving members of the band.

Criticisms 

Following the release of this publication, former Led Zeppelin guitarist Jimmy Page reportedly threatened to sue its author over the book's contents.  According to Page:

Wall’s just writing a book designed to cash in on something he didn’t have anything to do with. He wasn’t a creative force in Led Zep. I’m at something of a disadvantage because I haven’t chosen to read that book, but I hear it’s totally distorted from people who do know about Led Zeppelin.

References

External links 
 WorldCat entry

2008 non-fiction books
Led Zeppelin
Biographies about musicians
Books about rock musicians